The Shire of Three Springs is a local government area in the Mid West region of Western Australia, about  north of the state capital Perth.

History
The Three Springs Road District was constituted on 2 November 1928 from parts of the neighbouring road districts of Mingenew, Perenjori and Carnamah. It held its first meeting on 2 February 1929, with E. Hunt as its first chairman. On 1 July 1961, it became a shire under the Local Government Act 1960, which reformed all remaining road districts into shires.

On 18 September 2009, the Shires of Mingenew, Three Springs, Morawa and Perenjori announced their intention to amalgamate. A formal agreement was signed five days later, and the name Billeranga was later chosen.

However, by February 2011, community pressure had led to the negotiations stalling, and on 16 April 2011, voters from the Shire of Perenjori defeated the proposal at a referendum.

Wards
The Shire is no longer divided into wards. The seven councillors represent all electors.

Towns and localities
The towns and localities of the Shire of Three Springs with population and size figures based on the most recent Australian census:

Population

Heritage-listed places

As of 2023, 47 places are heritage-listed in the Shire of Three Springs, of which one is on the State Register of Heritage Places, the former Duffy's Store & Billiard Saloon. The store, dating back to 1929, was added to the register on 24 March 2005.

References

External links
 
 Carnamah Historical Society and Museum

Three Springs